Italy has the world's 48th largest exclusive economic zone (EEZ), with an area of . Its EEZ is limited by maritime boundaries with neighboring countries to the north-west, east and southeast.

Italy's western sea territory stretches from the west coast of Italy in the Tyrrhenian Sea including the island Sardinia. The island Sicily is in the southernmost area. Lampedusa is Italy's southernmost point. It shares treaty-defined maritime boundaries with France, Spain, Algeria, Tunisia, Libya, Malta, Greece, Albania, Montenegro, Croatia and Slovenia.

History 
At the end of the nineties of the twentieth century, no country bordering the Mediterranean Sea proclaimed an EEZ, even if it had the right to do so. The basis of this situation were above all geographical considerations: at no point in the Mediterranean are the coasts 400 or more miles away from the opposite coasts of another country. There were also reasons of expediency, e.g. avoid disturbing the status quo for possible disputes. The Mediterranean was therefore characterized by extensive areas of high seas, and there were only limited areas reserved for fishing, such as a Maltese EEZ of 25 miles. In Italy, UNCLOS entered into force on 16 December 1994.

At the end of the 20th century this principle was undermined by initiatives of some countries:
1994: Algeria's restricted fishing area
1997: Spain's fisheries protection zone
2003: ecological protection zones of France; Croatian ecological and fisheries protection zone
2005: Libya fisheries protection zone
2006: the ecological protection zone of Italy
A boost to the creation of EEZs came from the European Union's marine resources management policy in order to counter the development of illegal fishing by fishing vessels from Asian countries (see Common Fisheries Policy).

Geography 
These are the 10 largest islands of Italy.

Disputes

Algeria
Algeria established an EEZ on 17 April 2018. On 28 November 2018 the permanent mission of Italy to the United Nations indicated with Spain that the Algerian measure was taken unilaterally and without consulting them. On 20 June 2019, Algeria communicated to the Italian embassy the eligibility for their exclusive economic zone.

Croatia
Croatia's ZERP (Ecological and Fisheries Protection Zone) in the Adriatic Sea caused friction with Italy and Slovenia, and caused problems during the accession of Croatia to the European Union.

France
On 21 March 2015, a treaty was signed in Caen to define the maritime borders along the French Riviera, between the Tuscan Archipelago and Corsica and north of Sardinia in the Strait of Bonifacio. This agreement would transpose the international norms on maritime borders respecting the principle of equidistance, replacing the Menton agreements of 1892 and incorporating the agreements on the Strait of Bonifacio of 1986. In January 2016, following the seizure of the fishing boat "Mina" off the Ligurian coast, the issue assumed relevance in the Italian political debate. Subsequently, France admitted the error in seizing the fishing boat since the treaty had not been ratified by the Italian parliament and was consequently null and void.

See also
 Geography of Italy
 Exclusive economic zone of France
 Exclusive economic zone of Greece
 Exclusive economic zone of Spain

References 

Italy
Borders of Italy
Economy of Italy
Algeria–Italy relations